Shirley Faye Nelson ( White, October 12, 1925 – April 27, 2022) was an American author of three books, including The Last Year of the War.

Early life
Nelson was born in New Jersey in 1925, and raised in Holliston, Massachusetts, the daughter of fundamentalist Christian parents Arnold and Merlyn White who once belonged to the Shiloh Colony in Maine. She attended Moody Bible Institute and Providence Bible Institute where she met her future husband, the author and academic Rudy Nelson, in the 1940s. The couple married in 1951.

Career
Nelson wrote three books, including The Last Year of the War which received many positive reviews and which won the Harper-Saxton Fellowship, the Chicago Friends of Literature award for fiction, and Honorable Mention for the Janet Heidinger Kafka Prize in 1979.  She also taught creative writing for ten years at Barrington College.  In 2006 she wrote and produced, along with her husband, the documentary film Precarious Peace: God and Guatemala.  In addition, Nelson published poetry and essays in a variety of magazines and journals, including Southwest Review, Family Circle, Books and Culture, Old House Journal, and The Christian Century. After publishing her first book, Nelson earned a master's degree in English from the University of Albany.

Personal life and death
Nelson died in Amherst, Massachusetts on April 27, 2022, at the age of 96.

Publications

Books
The Last Year of the War (Harper and Row, 1978).
Fair, Clear and Terrible: The Story of Shiloh, Maine (British American Publishing, 1989).
The Risk of Returning (Troy Book Makers, 2014).

Anthologies
Entries in The Eternal Present (daily readings), ed. Andrea Wells Miller.   New York, Berkeley:  The Crossroads Publishing Company, 2003.
“Frank Sandford: Tongues of Fire in Shiloh, Maine,” essay in  Portraits of a Generation: Early Pentecostal Leaders, ed. James  Goff, Jr., and Grant Wacker, pp. 51–69.  Fayetteville: University of Arkansas Press, 2002. With Rudy Nelson.
“Prospecting,” essay in Rattling Those Dry Bones:  Women Changing the Church, ed. June Hagen. San Diego, CA: Luramedia, 1995.
“The Secret Stair (My MacDonald Syndrome),” Once Upon a  Christmas, A Treasury of Memories, ed. Emilie Griffin. Norwalk, CT: The C.R. Gibson Company, 1993.
“All Souls Day,” essay in Epiphanies: Stories for the Christian Year, ed. Eugene Peterson. New York: Macmillan Publishing Co., 1992.

Periodicals
“Making Peace,” back story to documentary “Precarious Peace: God and Guatemala,” Image: Journal of Art and Religion, #44 (Winter, 2004), with Rudy Nelson.
“The Ethics of Remembering:  Echoes of the Sixties,” featured review  of Sue Miller's “The Distinguished Guest” in Christian Century, Vol. 114, #9 (March 12, 1997).
“The Things File,” short story in Image: Journal of the Arts and Religion, #11 (Fall 1995).
“Stewards of the Imagination:  Ron Hansen, Larry Woiwode and Sue Miller,” in Christian Century, Vol. 112, #3 (January 25, 1995).

References

1925 births
2022 deaths
20th-century American women writers
People from Holliston, Massachusetts